Harry Zephaniah Johnson (6 July 1945 – 3 April 2013), known by the stage name Harry J, was a Jamaican reggae record producer.

Biography
Born in Westmoreland Parish, Jamaica, Johnson started to play music with the Virtues as a bass player before moving into management of the group. When the band split up he worked as an insurance salesman. He first appeared as a record producer in 1968, when he launched his own record label, "Harry J", by releasing The Beltones' local hit "No More Heartaches", one of the earliest reggae songs to be recorded. His agreement with Coxsone Dodd allowed him to use Studio One's facilities, where he produced the hit "Cuss Cuss" with singer Lloyd Robinson, which became one of the most covered riddims in Jamaica. Johnson also released music under a subsidiary label, Jaywax.

In October 1969, he met success in the UK with "The Liquidator" (number 9 in the UK Singles Chart) recorded with his sessionband, The Harry J All Stars. (it was also a hit again in 1980, reaching number 42.) This single became one of the anthems of the emerging skinhead youth subculture; together with other instrumental hits released in the UK through his own subdivision "Harry J" on Trojan Records, on a compilation album of the same name.

In the beginning of the 1970s, he enjoyed another big success with the vocal duo Bob and Marcia with the song "Young, Gifted and Black". His productions also included Jamaican hits with DJs like Winston Blake or Scotty among others, and many dub versions.

Harry J Studio
Johnson is mainly known for his Harry J Studio where Bob Marley & The Wailers recorded some of their albums in the 1970s. The studio was also a 'must stop' hangout of many British and other musicians including the Rolling Stones, The Who, and Grace Jones. In addition, Chris Blackwell, founder of Island Records, could be found hanging out in the sound room prior to moving to England in the early 1970s.

In 1972, Harry Johnson sold his record shop and set up his own recording studio "Harry J", on 10 Roosevelt Avenue, Uptown Kingston, where he employed Sid Bucknor and later Sylvan Morris as resident recording engineer. Harry J Studio soon became one of the most famous Jamaican studios after having recorded several Bob Marley & The Wailers albums from 1973 to 1976 before the Tuff Gong era, such as Rastaman Vibration and Catch A Fire.

Johnson's deal with Island Records led him to record artists such as Burning Spear and The Heptones. Throughout the 1970s and the 1980s, assisted by former Studio One sound engineer Sylvan Morris, he also recorded Ken Boothe, Augustus Pablo, The Cables and the American pop singer, Johnny Nash, and produced albums by Zap Pow and Sheila Hylton. In 2000, after seven years of inactivity, Stephen Stewart who worked in the early years alongside Sylvan Morris, refurbished, re-equipped and reopened Harry J Studio. Since then under the management of Stewart the studio has seen the return of Burning Spear, Toots, Shaggy, Sly & Robbie, and newer projects of Shakira, Papa Sam/Kirk Franklyn, Luciano and Sizzla. The studio appeared in the film, Rockers.

Personal life
Johnson died on 3 April 2013 after a long battle with diabetes. He was 67.

Discography

Harry J Allstars
 Harry J Allstars – The Liquidator – 1969 – Harry J/Trojan
 Harry J Allstars – Liquidator: The Best Of The Harry J Allstars – 2003 – Trojan
 Harry J Allstars – Dubbing At Harry J's 1972–1975 – Jamaican Recordings

Compilations
 Various Artists – Reggae Movement – 1970 – Harry J/Trojan
 Various Artists – What Am I To Do – 1970 – Harry J/Trojan
 Various Artists – Reggay Roots – 1977 – Harry J
 Various Artists – Computer – 1985 – Sunset
 Various Artists – The Return Of the Liquidator: 30 Skinhead Classics 1968–1970 – 1989 – Trojan – 2 CD

As a producer
 Sylvan Morris & Harry J – Cultural Dub – 1978 – Harry J
 Sylvan Morris – Jah Jah Dub – Roosevelt
 The Heptones – Book of Rules – 1973 – Jaywax
 The Heptones – Cool Rasta – 1976 –  Trojan
 Leslie Butler – Ja-Gan – 1975 – Trojan
 Zap Pow – Revolution – 1976 – Trojan
 Lloyd Willis – Gits Plays Bob Marley's Greatest Hits – 1977 – Harry J
 The Melodians – Sweet Sensation – 1977 – Harry J
 Sheila Hilton – "Breakfast in Bed" – 1977– Harry J
 Dennis Brown – So Long Rastafari – 1979 – Harry J

See also
 List of Jamaican record producers

References

1945 births
2013 deaths
Deaths from diabetes
Jamaican guitarists
Male guitarists
Jamaican people of Scottish descent
Jamaican record producers
Jamaican reggae musicians
People from Westmoreland Parish
Trojan Records artists